Géry is the customary French form of Saint Gaugericus.

French communes named for the saint include:
Géry, Meuse, France
Saint-Géry (disambiguation), several French communes
Saint-Géry Island, former island in Brussels, Belgium

People with the surname Gery or Géry:
Jacques Géry (1917–2007), French ichthyologist
Jean Gery (also spelled Jean Jarry, Yan Jarri or Jean Henri) (before 1638–1690, French explorer
Marcel Gery (born 1965), Slovakian and Canadian swimmer
Wade-Gery:
Laura Wade-Gery (born 1965), British business executive
Sir Robert Wade-Gery (1929–2015), British diplomat
Theodore Wade-Gery (1888–1972), British classical scholar, historian and epigrapher

Gery and Géry are also male given names, including:
Géry de Ghersem (also Géry Gersem) (1573/75–1630), Franco-Flemish composer